Oklungen Station is a former railway station on the Vestfold Line in the village of Oklungen in Porsgrunn, Norway. The station was served by regional trains operated by the Norwegian State Railways. The station opened as part of Vestfold Line in 1882.

External links
Jernbaneverket's entry on Oklungen station 

Railway stations in Porsgrunn
Railway stations on the Vestfold Line
Railway stations opened in 1882
1882 establishments in Norway